Tondiarpet is a northern neighbourhood of Chennai.

Tondiarpet may also refer to:

 Tondiarpet railway station
 Tondiarpet taluk
 Tondiarpet division
 Tondiarpet marshalling yard